Schenke is a surname. Notable people with the surname include:

Hans-Martin Schenke (born 1929, died 2002), German Coptologist and scholar of Gnosticism
Siegfried Schenke (born 1943), East German sprinter
Tobias Schenke (born 1981), German actor

See also
Schenk
Schenken